Almost You is a 1985 American romantic comedy film directed by Adam Brooks and starring Brooke Adams and Griffin Dunne. It won the Special Jury Prize at the 1985 Sundance Film Festival.

Almost You was Brooks' first film as director.  The screenplay was written by Mark Horowitz.

Premise
Complications arise when a man and woman who have been having an affair attend a dinner party with their spouses and friends.

Cast
 Brooke Adams as Erica Boyer
 Griffin Dunne as Alex Boyer
 Karen Young as Lisa Willoughby
 Marty Watt as Kevin Danzing
 Christine Estabrook as Maggie
 Dana Delany as Susan McCall
 Laura Dean as Jeannie
 Josh Mostel as David
 Miguel Pinero as Ralph
 Daryl Edwards as Sal
 Mark Metcalf as Andrews
 Seth Allen as Frank Rose
 Joe Silver as Uncle Stu
 Joe Leon as Uncle Mel
 Harvey Waldman as The Director
 Spalding Gray as Travel Agent
 Suzan Hughes as The Bartender
 Wendy Creed as The Waitress
 Suzzy Roche as The Receptionist
 Steve DeLuca as Policeman #1
 Jim Phelan as Policeman #2

References

External links

1985 films
Films directed by Adam Brooks
Films scored by Jonathan Elias
1985 comedy-drama films
1985 directorial debut films
American comedy-drama films
Sundance Film Festival award winners
1980s English-language films
1980s American films